7476 Ogilsbie, provisional designation , is a carbonaceous asteroid from the outer region of the asteroid belt, approximately 20 kilometers in diameter. It was discovered by American astronomer Timothy Spahr at the U.S. Catalina Station in Tucson, Arizona, on 14 April 1993.

Orbit and classification 

Ogilsbie orbits the Sun in the outer main-belt at a distance of 2.4–3.9 AU once every 5 years and 7 months (2,043 days). Its orbit has an eccentricity of 0.23 and an inclination of 26° with respect to the ecliptic. The first used precovery was obtained at Palomar Observatory in 1990, extending the asteroid's observation arc by 3 years prior to its discovery. The first (unused) observation at Palomar dates back to 1953.

Physical characteristics 

In 2010, a photometric lightcurve analysis by Italian astronomer Andrea Ferrero at the Bigmuskie Observatory in Mombercelli, Italy, rendered a well-defined rotation period of  hours with a brightness amplitude of 0.40 in magnitude.

According to the survey carried out by the NEOWISE mission of NASA's space-based Wide-field Infrared Survey Explorer, Ogilsbie has a diameter of 18.5 and 19.0 kilometer based on an albedo of 0.15 and 0.18, respectively, while the Collaborative Asteroid Lightcurve Link assumes a standard albedo for carbonaceous asteroids of 0.057 and hence calculates a larger diameter of 27.9 kilometers.

Naming 

This minor planet was named in memory of Brian K. Ogilsbie (1970–1997). School mate and good friend, he is well remembered by the discoverer for the long talks they had on their excursions. The official naming citation was published by the Minor Planet Center on 27 April 2002.

References

External links 
 Asteroid Lightcurve Database (LCDB), query form (info )
 Dictionary of Minor Planet Names, Google books
 Asteroids and comets rotation curves, CdR – Observatoire de Genève, Raoul Behrend
 Discovery Circumstances: Numbered Minor Planets (5001)-(10000) – Minor Planet Center
 
 

007476
Discoveries by Timothy B. Spahr
Named minor planets
19930414